Rafiqul Islam, also known as Dr Hafiz Rafiqul Islam is an Indian politician serving as a member of Assam Legislative Assembly from AIUDF since 2011. Dr Islam got elected in 2021 with the highest margin of votes i.e. 1.4 lakh, in the state of assam from Jania constituency, he has also served as a Guest Professor in Gauhati University.Islam is the Chief Whip for AIUDF in ALA, General Secretary and Spokesperson of AIUDF party. He was born in Kalgachia, Barpeta Assam in 1979.

References 

Living people
All India United Democratic Front politicians
People from Barpeta district
Assam MLAs 2011–2016
Assam MLAs 2016–2021
1979 births